The Parole and Probation Administration (Filipino: Pangasiwaan sa Parol at Probasyon), abbreviated as PPA, is an agency of the Philippine government under the Department of Justice responsible for providing a less costly alternative to imprisonment of first-time offenders who are likely to respond to individualized community-based treatment programs.

History
Probation was first introduced in the Philippines during the American colonial period (1898–1945) with the enactment of Act No. 4221 of the Philippine Legislature on August 7, 1935. This law created a Probation Office under the Department of Justice. On November 16, 1937, after barely two years of existence, the Supreme Court of the Philippines declared the Probation Law unconstitutional because of some defects in the law's procedural framework.

In 1972, House Bill No. 393 was filed in Congress, which would establish a probation system in the Philippines. This bill avoided the objectionable features of Act 4221 that struck down the 1935 law as unconstitutional. The bill was passed by the House of Representatives, but was pending in the Senate when Martial Law was declared and Congress was abolished.

In 1975, the National Police Commission Interdisciplinary drafted a Probation Law. After 18 technical hearings over a period of six months, the draft decree was presented to a selected group of 369 jurists, penologists, civic leaders and social and behavioral scientists and practitioners. The group overwhelmingly endorsed the establishment of an Adult Probation System in the country.

On July 24, 1976, Presidential Decree No. 968, also known as Adult Probation Law of 1976, was signed into Law by the President of the Philippines.

The startup of the probation system in 1976-1977 was a massive undertaking during which all judges and prosecutors nationwide were trained in probation methods and procedures; administrative and procedural manuals were developed; probation officers recruited and trained, and the central agency and probation field offices organized throughout the country. Fifteen selected probation officers were sent to United States for orientation and training in probation administration. Upon their return, they were assigned to train the newly recruited probation officers.

The probation system started to operate on January 3, 1978. As more probation officers were recruited and trained, more field offices were opened. There are at present 204 field offices spread all over the country, supervised by 15 regional offices.

Organization 
The Probation Administration was created by virtue of Presidential Decree No. 968, “The Probation Law of 1976”, signed by then President Ferdinand E. Marcos to administer the probation system.

Under Executive Order No. 292, “The Administrative Code of 1987” which was promulgated on November 23, 1989, the Probation Administration was renamed “Parole and Probation Administration” and given the added function of supervising prisoners who, after serving part of their sentence in jails are released on parole pardon with parole conditions

Effective August 17, 2005, by virtue of a Memorandum of Agreement with the Dangerous Drugs Board, the Administration performs another additional function of investigating and supervising first-time minor drug offenders who are placed on suspended pursuant to Republic Act No. 9165.

Mission
To rehabilitate and reintegrate persons on community-based corrections for peace and social justice.

Mandate
The Parole and Probation Administration is mandated to conserve and/or redeem convicted offenders and prisoners who are under the probation or parole system.

Goals
The Administration's programs sets to achieve the following goals:

 Promote the reformation of criminal offenders and reduce the incidence of recidivism, and
 Provide a cheaper alternative to the institutional confinement of first-time offenders who are likely to respond to individualized, community-based treatment programs.

Functions
To carry out these goals, the Agency through its network of regional and field parole and probation offices performs the following functions:

 to administer the parole and probation system
 to exercise supervision over parolees, pardonees and probationers
 to promote the correction and rehabilitation of criminal offenders.

Major Rehabilitation Programs

The RESTORATIVE JUSTICE (RJ)  is a philosophy and a process whereby stakeholders in a specific offense resolve collectively  how  to deal with the aftermath of the offense and its implications for the future. It is a victim-centered response to crime that provides opportunity for those directly affected by the crime - the victim, the offender, their families and the community - to  be directly involved in responding to the harm caused by the crime. Its ultimate objective is to restore the broken relationships among stakeholders.

The  Restorative Justice  process provides a healing opportunity for affected parties to facilitate the recovery of the     concerned parties and allow them to move on with their lives.

The THERAPEUTIC COMMUNITY (TC) is a self-help social learning treatment model used in the rehabilitation of drug offenders and other clients with behavioral problems. TC adheres to precepts of  “right living” - Responsible Love and Concern; Truth and  Honesty;  the  Here and  Now; Personal Responsibility for Destiny; Social Responsibility (brother’s keeper);  Moral Code; Work Ethics and Pride in Quality.

The  Therapeutic Community  (TC) is an environment that helps people get help while helping themselves. It operates in a  similar fashion to a functional family with a hierarchical structure of older and younger members. Each member has a defined role and responsibilities for sustaining the proper functioning of the TC. There are sets of rules and community norms that members commit to live by and uphold upon entry. The primary “therapist” and teacher is the community itself, consisting of peers, staff/probation and parole officers and even Volunteer Probation Aides  (VPA), who, as role models of successful personal change, serve as guides in the recovery process.

The VOLUNTEER  PROBATION ASSISTANT  (VPA)  PROGRAM is a strategy by which the Parole and Probation Administration may be  able to generate maximum citizen participation or community involvement.

Citizens of good standing in the community may volunteer to assist the probation and parole officers in the supervision of a  number of probationers,  parolees and conditional pardonees in their respective communities. Since they reside in the same community as the client, they are able to usher in the reformation and rehabilitation of the clients hands-on.

In collaboration with the PPO, the VPA helps pave the way for the offender, victim and community to each heal from the harm resulting from the crime done.  They  can initiate a circle of support  for clients and victims  to  prevent  further crimes,  thereby  be participants  in nation-building

See also
Department of Justice

References

Sources 
Presidential Decree 968, as amended
E.O. 468, s. 2005 Revitalizing the Volunteer Probation Aide (VPA) Program of the PAROLE AND PROBATION ADMINISTRATION
Republic Act 10707, An Act Amending Presidential Decree No. 968, Otherwise Known As The "PROBATION LAW OF 1976", As Amended
http://probation.gov.ph

External links
PPA Homepage
PPA Region 8

Department of Justice (Philippines)
Law enforcement in the Philippines
Prison and correctional agencies
Establishments by Philippine presidential decree